Dean Oliver (born 4 December 1987) is an English former professional footballer. He is currently with Gresley.

Career history

Sheffield United
Oliver was born in Derby and joined Sheffield United as a trainee. He was released by Derby County when he was a youngster prior to signing with Sheffield United. Whilst at United he was in need of first team experience and was loaned, first to Hednesford Town in January 2007 and then to Torquay United on 1 March 2007. His league debut came on 10 March 2007 when he replaced Lee Thorpe as a late substitute in the 3–0 win at home to Wycombe Wanderers. However, this was his only appearance for Torquay before being recalled by Sheffield United on 24 April 2007, with Torquay already relegated to the Conference National.

Oliver joined Halifax Town on a month's loan in October 2007, playing two games for The Shaymen. He was released by the Blades at the end of the season having failed to break into the first team. He joined Eastwood Town, but was on loan to Buxton when signed by Belper Town in November 2008.

Dean moved from Stamford AFC to Gresley F.C. in September 2011 and went on to make 51 appearances, scoring 22 goals for the Moatmen. He was the winner of their most man of the match awards prize for the 2011/12 season. Dean left Gresley in October 2012 for Stafford Rangers, before returning to Gresley in Summer 2013.

References

External links

1987 births
Living people
Footballers from Derby
English footballers
Association football forwards
English Football League players
Sheffield United F.C. players
Torquay United F.C. players
Halifax Town A.F.C. players
Eastwood Town F.C. players
Buxton F.C. players
Belper Town F.C. players
Stafford Rangers F.C. players
Gresley F.C. players